County governor may refer to:
 County governor (Lithuania), the first-level administrative unit of Lithuania
 County governor (Norway), a Norwegian government agency
 County governor (Sweden) (Swedish: landshövding)

da:Landshøvding (flertydig)
sv:Landshövding